The Women's 70 kg competition at the 2010 World Judo Championships was held at 10 September at the Yoyogi National Gymnasium in Tokyo, Japan. 35 competitors contested for the medals, being split in 4 Pools where the winner advanced to the medal round.

Pool A

Pool B
 Last 16 fight:  Moira de Villiers 000 vs.  Kelita Zupancic 100

Pool C
 Last 16 fight:  Laquinta Allen 100 vs.  Fouzia Mumtaz 000

Pool D
 Last 16 fight:  Patcharee Pichaipat 000 vs.  Choi Mi-Young 110'''

Repechage

Finals

References

 Results

External links
 
 Official Site 

W70
World Judo Championships Women's Middleweight
World W70